The Pro Basketball League (PBL), was the highest tier level professional basketball league in Belgium for clubs. In 2021, the league was succeeded by the Belgian-Dutch BNXT League.

Through 2014, for sponsorship reasons, the league was previously known as the Ethias League, and from 2014 to 2016, it was known as the Scoore! League, also for sponsorship reasons. The league is organized by the Basketball League Belgium. The current president of the league is Maarten Bostyn.

The most successful team in the league is Oostende, which holds the record for the most league titles won, with 22, and the now defunct team of Racing Mechelen is second, with 15.

History
On 15 March 2020, as a result of the COVID-19 pandemic the season was prematurely cancelled. Based on the standings in the regular season, Filou Oostende was crowned national champions.

Sponsorship names
Until 2014: Ethias League
 2014–2016: Scooore! League
 2016–present EuroMillions Basketball League

Format and rules
The BLB is played by the international FIBA rules. Since 2014–15 the BLB season has a new format. In the regular season, all teams play each other first home and away. After that first round the league is divided in two groups based on standings; in the first group teams ranked 1–6 play and in the second 7–11. After the split each team plays all others in its group once home and once away. After that the Playoffs are played by eight teams. The quarterfinals consist of best-of-three series and the semi- and finals are played in a best-of-five format.

Licensing
Teams that play in the BLB all have to get a license to play in the league. There are three types of licenses:
A-license: for teams who have more than a € 1 million budget. A-licensed team can qualify for European competitions.
B-license: teams with at least a €750,000 budget. B-licensed teams can't qualify for European play.
C-licence: given to teams that are on the rise, with a budget of at least €400,000. C-licenses do not allow teams to qualify for European play and have to get replaced by B-licenses after two years.

Current clubs

Finals
Since 2005, play-offs are played to decide which team is crowned the champion of each season. The finals series are played in a best-of-five format, with the team which had the higher seed in the regular season having home court advantage.

Performances by club (2005–present)

Title holders

 1927–28 Brussels A.C.
 1928–29 Daring B.C.
 1929–30 Brussels A.C.
 1930–31 Brussels A.C.
 1931–32 Daring B.C.
 1932–33 Brussels A.C.
 1933–34 Daring B.C.
 1934–35 Amicale Sportive
 1935–36 Amicale Sportive
 1936–37 Fresh Air
 1937–38 Fresh Air
 1938–39 Royal IV
 1939–41 Not held due to WWII
 1941–42 Royal IV
 1942–45 Not held due to WWII
 1945–46 Semailles
 1946–47 Semailles
 1947–48 Semailles
 1948–49 Semailles
 1949–50 Semailles
 1950–51 Semailles
 1951–52 Royal IV
 1953–53 Royal IV
 1953–54 Royal IV
 1954–55 Hellas Gent
 1955–56 Antwerpse
 1956–57 Royal IV
 1957–58 Royal IV
 1958–59 Antwerpse
 1959–60 Antwerpse
 1960–61 Antwerpse
 1961–62 Antwerpse
 1962–63 Antwerpse
 1963–64 Antwerpse
 1964–65 Racing Mechelen
 1965–66 Racing Mechelen
 1966–67 Racing Mechelen
 1967–68 Standard Liège
 1968–69 Racing Bell Mechelen
 1969–70 Standard Liège
 1970–71 Bus Fruit Lier
 1971–72 Bus Fruit Lier
 1972–73 Racing Antwerpen
 1973–74 Maes Pils 
 1974–75 Maes Pils 
 1975–76 Maes Pils 
 1976–77 Standard Liège
 1977–78 Fresh Air
 1978–79 Fresh Air
 1979–80 Maes Pils 
 1980–81 Sunair Oostende
 1981–82 Sunair Oostende
 1982–83 Sunair Oostende
 1983–84 Sunair Oostende
 1984–85 Sunair Oostende
 1985–86 Sunair Oostende
 1986–87 Maes Pils 
 1987–88 Sunair Oostende
 1988–89 Maes Pils 
 1989–90 Maes Pils 
 1990–91 Maes Pils 
 1991–92 Maes Pils 
 1992–93 Maes Pils 
 1993–94 Maes Pils 
 1994–95 Sunair Oostende
 1995–96 Spirou
 1996–97 Spirou
 1997–98 Spirou
 1998–99 Spirou
 1999–00 Telindus Racing Antwerpen
 2000–01 Telindus Oostende
 2001–02 Telindus Oostende
 2002–03 Spirou
 2003–04 Spirou
 2004–05 Euphony Bree
 2005–06 Telindus Oostende
 2006–07 Telindus Oostende
 2007–08 Spirou
 2008–09 Spirou
 2009–10 Spirou
 2010–11 Spirou
 2011–12 Telenet Oostende
 2012–13 Telenet Oostende
 2013–14 Telenet Oostende
 2014–15 Telenet Oostende
 2015–16 Telenet Oostende
 2016–17 Telenet Oostende
 2017–18 Telenet Oostende
 2018–19 Filou Oostende
 2019–20 Filou Oostende
 2020–21 Filou Oostende
 2021–22 Filou Oostende

Performance by club

Individual awards
Not all awards are official ones handed out by the league itself, but all are regarded and respected as BLB awards. As example the Belgian Player of the Year award is handed out by the Belgian newspaper Het Nieuwsblad, but the league itself reports the winner on its website.

Belgian Basketball Player of the year
Coach of the Year
MVP
Star of the Coaches
Young Player of the Year
Lifetime Achievement Award

References

External links
 Official website
 Eurobasket.com League Page

 
 
Basketball leagues in Europe
Basketball competitions in Belgium
Professional sports leagues in Belgium